Mampikony is a district in northern Madagascar. It is a part of Sofia Region and borders the districts of 
Boriziny (Port-Bergé) in north, Marovoay and Ambatoboeny in west, Tsaratanana in south and Andilamena in east.

Communes
The district is further divided into 6 communes:

 Ambohitoaka
 Ampasimatera
 Bekoratsaka
 Komajia
 Mampikony
 Mampikony II

References and notes

Districts of Sofia Region